Warren Township is one of the twenty-two townships of Tuscarawas County, Ohio, United States.  The 2000 census found 1,194 people in the township.

Geography
Located in the northeastern part of the county, it borders the following townships:
Rose Township, Carroll County - north
Monroe Township, Carroll County - northeast
Orange Township, Carroll County - southeast
Union Township - south
Goshen Township - southwest
Fairfield Township - west
Sandy Township - northwest

No municipalities are located in Warren Township.

Name and history
It is one of five Warren Townships statewide.

Government
The township is governed by a three-member board of trustees, who are elected in November of odd-numbered years to a four-year term beginning on the following January 1. Two are elected in the year after the presidential election and one is elected in the year before it. There is also an elected township fiscal officer, who serves a four-year term beginning on April 1 of the year after the election, which is held in November of the year before the presidential election. Vacancies in the fiscal officership or on the board of trustees are filled by the remaining trustees.  The current trustees are William McDonnell, Todd Miller, and Jeffrey Latimer, and the fiscal officer is Mary Ellen Gooding.

References

External links
County website

Townships in Tuscarawas County, Ohio
Townships in Ohio